Spirit is a 2002 bronze sculpture depicting John Denver, by American sculptor Sue DiCicco. Originally commissioned by and located at the Windstar Foundation, the bronze is now located at the Colorado Music Hall of Fame at Red Rocks. It was cast at Artworks Foundry in Berkeley, California, and was named "Spirit" by Rolland Smith, who served as master of ceremonies at the unveiling in October 2002. The statue was financed by Denver's fans.

Design
The statue shows singer and songwriter John Denver holding a large eagle in his left hand, with his guitar slung over his back.

Background 
The statue was originally commissioned by the Windstar Foundation, an environmental non-profit organization that Denver founded in the 1970s. Since its unveiling in 2002, the Spirit statue was a fixture at the Windstar property in Snowmass, Colorado, but it was moved following the dissolution of the Windstar Foundation. The Windstar property was sold in early 2013.

Current location 
In September 2013, after the Windstar Foundation was dissolved and its assets sold, the Spirit statue was removed from the Snowmass property and given to the Colorado Music Hall of Fame. Spirit moved with the Colorado Music Hall of Fame to its new location at Red Rocks in 2015.

Although some of Denver's fans were upset to see the Windstar property sold and the Spirit statue moved, most people – including Denver's former wife – think the Colorado Music Hall of Fame is a fitting location for the massive statue. Denver was the first performer inducted into the Colorado Music Hall of Fame in April 2011.

References

2002 sculptures
Sculptures of birds in the United States
Bronze sculptures in Colorado
John Denver
Sculptures of men in Colorado
Statues in Colorado
Statues of musicians in the United States
Musical instruments in art